The Samsung Galaxy A14 is a series of Android smartphone designed and manufactured by Samsung Electronics. Samsung Galaxy A14 5G was announced on January 4, 2023, and Samsung Galaxy A14 was announced on February 28, 2023.

References 

Samsung Galaxy
Mobile phones introduced in 2023
Android (operating system) devices
Samsung smartphones
Mobile phones with multiple rear cameras